is a Japanese professional footballer who plays as a goalkeeper for  club Iwate Grulla Morioka.

Club career statistics
.

Reserves performance

Honours

Club
J1 League: 2021
Emperor's Cup: 2020
Japanese Super Cup: 2021

References

External links

1986 births
Living people
Association football people from Miyagi Prefecture
Japanese footballers
J1 League players
J2 League players
J3 League players
Cerezo Osaka players
Cerezo Osaka U-23 players
V-Varen Nagasaki players
Oita Trinita players
Kawasaki Frontale players
Iwate Grulla Morioka players
Association football goalkeepers